Elena Fomina is a former Russian football midfielder, who played for ShVSM Izmailovo in the Russian women's football championship She previously played for Spartak Moscow, Chertanovo Moscow, CSK VVS Samara, Lada Togliatti and Nadezhda Noginsk.

She has been a member of the Russian national team, and played the 2003 World Cup, where she scored a last-minute winner in the first match against Australia and the 2009 European Championship.

References

1979 births
Living people
Russian women's footballers
Russia women's international footballers
1999 FIFA Women's World Cup players
2003 FIFA Women's World Cup players
Nadezhda Noginsk players
FC Spartak Moscow (women) players
CSP Izmailovo players
Women's association football midfielders
Russian football managers
Female association football managers
Russia women's national football team managers
CSK VVS Samara (women's football club) players
FC Lada Togliatti (women) players
FC Chertanovo Moscow (women) players
Russian Women's Football Championship players
21st-century Russian women